Steve Houben (born 19 March 1950 in Liège, Belgium) is a Belgian jazz saxophonist and flutist.

Biography 
In the mid-1970s, Houben attended the Berklee College of Music in Boston. When he returned to Belgium, he established the jazz seminar at the Liège conservatory, in association with Henri Pousseur. In his long career he played with Joe Newman, Bill Frisell, Toots Thielemans, Chet Baker, Mike Stern, George Coleman, and Gerry Mulligan.

He won the Belgian Golden Django in 2000 for best Belgian artist (first winner of the new category). Houben was one of the first musicians to see the potential of singer Melanie De Biasio, inviting her to perform at several concerts and a tour of Russia. He also appeared on her first album, "A Stomach is Burning". He currently teaches jazz saxophone at the Brussels conservatory.

Discography 
1980: Chet Baker & Steve Houben (52e Rue Est)
1994: Blue Circumstances
1995: Songs by Gershwin & Porter
2000: Le Saxophone et le Jazz
2007: Un Ange Passe
2011: Darker Scales with Boyan Vodenitcharov
2017: Comptines (re-release of a 1982 album with pianist Charles Loos)

References

External links 
 Steve Houben Quartet at Jazz Bez 2014 at YouTube

Musicians from Liège
1950 births
Living people
Belgian jazz musicians
Berklee College of Music alumni
Belgian jazz saxophonists
Academic staff of the Royal Conservatory of Liège
Academic staff of the Royal Conservatory of Brussels
Members of the Royal Academy of Belgium
Walloon people
21st-century saxophonists
Igloo Records artists